Sasalbé (or Salsalbé) is a commune in the Cercle of Mopti in the Mopti Region of Mali. The commune contains nine villages. The administrative center (chef-lieu) is the village of N'Gouréma Toboro.

References

External links
.

Communes of Mopti Region